Gropp is a surname. Notable people with the surname include:

Bill Gropp, American computer scientist
Reint E. Gropp (born 1966), German economist